Library of Jonava or Public library of Jonava district municipality is a public library in the town of Jonava, Lithuania.

During World War II, the library was closed and all books were destroyed. From 1945 to 1946, the public library was re-opened.

External links

 

Library
Libraries in Lithuania